Yeni Álvarez is a Cuban-American actress. She is best known for her role as Anita in the Spanish-language situation comedy series Los Beltran.

Personal life
Álvarez was born in Cuba, but left the country with her family to Miami, Florida, when she was ten. She married actor Mark DeCarlo on November 24, 2012.

Filmography

Television
Los Beltrán (2001) – Anita Beltrán
Resurrection Blvd. (2001) – Tiffany
Line of Fire (2003) – Juana Contrera
Static Shock (2004) – Aquamaria (voice)
Judging Amy (2004)
Without a Trace (2005) – Sophia
Summerland (2005) – Paramedic
Crossing Jordan (2005) – Paramedic
Criminal Minds (2005) – Aide
Glenn Martin, DDS (2010) – Mercedes (voice)
Ben 10: Ultimate Alien (2011) – Dr. Borges (voice)
Get Blake! (2015) – Carmen de la Cruz (voice)

Video games
Freedom: First Resistance (2000) – Angel Sanchez
Total Overdose (2005) – Angel / Hooker
Lego Marvel Super Heroes (2013) – Black Widow / Mystique / Jean Grey / Dark Phoenix
The Lego Movie Videogame (2014) – Wyldstyle
Heroes of the Storm (2015) – Lt. Rosa Morales

References

External links

Living people
American television actresses
American voice actresses
Cuban emigrants to the United States
Hispanic and Latino American actresses
Year of birth missing (living people)
21st-century American women